Ccache is a software development tool that caches compilations so that the next time, the same compilation can be avoided and the results can be taken from the cache. This can greatly speed up recompilation time. The detection is done by hashing different kinds of information that should be unique for the compilation and then using the hash sum to identify the cached output. Ccache is licensed under the GNU General Public License.

See also 

 distcc

References

External links 

 

C (programming language) compilers
Compiling tools
Cache (computing)